is a Japanese footballer who currently plays for Persebaya Surabaya.

He joined Ehime FC in the Japan Football League after graduating from Juntendo University and have played for Denso FC and Japan's College of Upward Players in Soccer prior to joining Albirex Niigata FC (Singapore). He is also the captain of the side.
On October 2009, he start playing for Persebaya Surabaya.

References

External links
 

Living people
1982 births
Japanese footballers
Japanese expatriate footballers
Ehime FC players
Expatriate footballers in Singapore
Japanese expatriate sportspeople in Singapore
Albirex Niigata Singapore FC players
Singapore Premier League players
Expatriate footballers in Indonesia
Japanese expatriate sportspeople in Indonesia
Persebaya Surabaya players
Liga 1 (Indonesia) players
Japanese expatriate sportspeople in Cambodia
Association football defenders